Florina is a rural locality in the Northern Territory, Australia. The locality was officially defined in April 2007, named for Florina Station, the first European settlement in the area.

References

Populated places in the Northern Territory